The Indian national cricket team visited Zimbabwe in February 1997 and played two Limited Overs Internationals (LOIs) on 15 and 17 February 1997 at Queens Sports Club, Bulawayo, against the Zimbabwean national cricket team. Zimbabwe won by 8 wickets and were captained by Alistair Campbell; India by Sachin Tendulkar.

ODI series summary

First ODI

Second ODI

References

External links

1997 in Indian cricket
1997 in Zimbabwean cricket
Indian cricket tours of Zimbabwe
International cricket competitions from 1994–95 to 1997
Zimbabwean cricket seasons from 1980–81 to 1999–2000